Emmanuelle is the lead character in a series of French erotic films based on the main character in the novel Emmanuelle (1959), created by Emmanuelle Arsan.

Character history 
Emmanuelle appeared as the pen name of Marayat Rollet-Andriane, a French-Thai actress born in the 1930s in Bangkok. Her 1957 book The Joys of a Woman detailed the sexual exploits of Emmanuelle, the "bored housewife" of a French diplomat. Rollet-Andriane's book caused a sensation in France and was banned.

The producer of another Arsan/Rollet-Andriane film Laure, Ovidio Assonitis, claimed that all books published under the pen name Emmanuelle Arsan were written by her husband Louis-Jacques Rollet-Andriane, rather than by Marayat.

Films 
The first Emmanuelle film was the 1974 French theatrical feature Emmanuelle starring Dutch actress Sylvia Kristel (1952–2012) in the title role. She came to be the actress best identified with the role. This film pushed the boundaries of what was then acceptable on screen, with sex scenes, skinny-dipping, masturbation, the "Mile High Club", rape, and a scene in which a dancer lights a cigarette and puffs it with her vagina. This film was created and directed by French director Just Jaeckin.

Unlike many films that tried to avoid an X-rating, the first Emmanuelle film embraced it, and became a success with a viewing audience estimated at 300 million. It remains one of France's most successful films, and played in the Arc de Triomphe theatre for over eleven years. In France and the US the film was uncut, but British censors balked at masturbation and explicit sex. Heavy cuts were made to the film including the complete removal of the opium den rape and the infamous 'cigarette' sequence in the club.

Several sequels starring Kristel followed, beginning with Emmanuelle 2 known as Emmanuelle: The Joys of a Woman in its U.S. release, and also Emmanuelle l’antivierge in some European press materials, including the soundtrack LP and CD. Kristel sold her interest for $150,000, missing on a share of the film's $26m domestic gross. She was paid $6,000 for her role but negotiated a $100,000 contract for the sequel, Emmanuelle 2.

Kristel stepped away from the role in the 1980s, yielding to younger actresses, but returned for the seventh feature film. In 1992 and 1993, Kristel reprised the role of an older Emmanuelle for a series of made-for-cable films with titles such as Emmanuelle's Love and Emmanuelle's Perfume, which featured Marcela Walerstein as a younger version of Kristel's character. Kristel did not take part in any love scenes for this series, which also co-starred George Lazenby, also in a non-sexual role. Kristel also appeared in films throughout her career that capitalized on or parodied her Emmanuelle image, such as the American sex comedy Private Lessons.

A number of unofficial productions in Italy, Japan and the United States cashed in on the Emmanuelle craze, changing the spelling of the title. In a number of cases, the character's name was spelled "Emanuelle" suggesting these films were not authorized. Among the best known were Italian "Black Emanuelle" films starring Laura Gemser, who became the second most popular actress to play Emanuelle in the 1970s. The 1978 spoof Carry On Emmannuelle (with double "N") starred Kenneth Williams as the French ambassador to London. Having lost his libido by landing on a church spire during a parachute jump, he discovers his sex-starved wife, Emmannuelle Prevert, has seduced a string of VIPs. It starred Suzanne Danielle in the title role.

After the last official Emmanuelle theatrical feature film, Emmanuelle au 7ème ciel (the seventh film for which Kristel returns as the main character), ASP began to produce further films, all featuring the character of Emmanuelle, albeit played by a series of actresses. These included a science fiction series in the 1990s called Emmanuelle in Space starring American actress Krista Allen in one of her first roles. Following spinoffs included TV series Emmanuelle 2000 starring Holly Sampson, TV and video series Emmanuelle's Private Collection starring Natasja Vermeer, and a one-off, Emmanuelle in Rio, starring Ludmilla Ferraz in her only acting credit.

At the 2008 Cannes Film Festival, Alain Siritzky said he was looking for a new Emmanuelle, with production on the first film scheduled to begin in September. It was announced at the 2011 Cannes Film Festival that Allie Haze (performing under the alias Brittany Joy) had been chosen. The direct-to-video series that starred Allie Haze was titled Emmanuelle Through Time.

The character of Emmanuelle is also featured in a video game of the same name, released by Coktel Vision in 1989.

Box office 
The film played to packed houses in Paris, running for years. Emmanuelle was also an international hit and has played to 300 million. French distribution company Studio Canal has acquired home video rights for a number of Emmanuelle movies and has released remastered DVDs of the films. Taking video and DVD into account revenue is estimated close to 650 million.

Explicit content 
The sexual explicitness in Emmanuelle films varies from arty softcore to full hardcore, although no penetration or oral sex made it to public versions. Many question the place of hardcore scenes in Emmanuelle and ASP never attempted to mix the two genres after experimenting in the late 1980s.

 Emmanuelle 4 (1984), starring Kristel and new Emmanuelle Mia Nygren, had hardcore scenes shot, but they were never used. These scenes, which did not involve the main actors, were included in television versions and turned up as extras on European DVD editions of Emmanuelle 4 and in a version called "Emmanuelle 4X" on a VHS in France in the 1980s. 
 Emmanuelle 5 (1987), directed by Walerian Borowczyk, was released in two versions: one with softcore love scenes, and a French home video version that extended several scenes with hardcore sex directed by Borowczyk (apparently Borowczyk said that he had not directed them). The scenes are the Love Express and dance studio segments, embellished with penetration, ejaculation and a woman urinating. This VHS version omits several minutes of footage seen in the public version (including dialogue and plot). 
 Emmanuelle 6 (1988) also had two hardcore scenes (one short without ejaculation, but with fellatio and penetration, between a man and a woman whom Emmanuelle watches in a horse box, and the second longer, with fellatio, penetration and ejaculation, starring the same couple entering the place where Emmanuelle is being held prisoner at the end of the movie), directed by erotic horror specialist Jean Rollin. However, they were not used in the theater version, but were included on a hardcore VHS version in France.

Filmography

Emmanuelle series (France)
 Emmanuelle (1974)
 Emmanuelle 2, also known as Emmanuelle, The Joys of a Woman (1975)
 Goodbye Emmanuelle, also known as Emmanuelle 3 (1977)
 Emmanuelle 4 (1984)
 Emmanuelle 5 (1987)
 Emmanuelle 6 (1988)
 Emmanuelle 7 (1993)

Emmanuelle made-for-TV films (France)
 Emmanuelle Forever (1993) 
 Emmanuelle's Love (1993)
 Emmanuelle's Magic (1993)
 Emmanuelle's Revenge (1993)
 Emmanuelle's Perfume (1993)
 Emmanuelle in Venice (1993)
 Emmanuelle's Secret (1993)

Emmanuelle in Space series (USA)
 Emmanuelle: First Contact, also known as Queen of the Galaxy (1994)
 Emmanuelle 2: A World of Desire (1994)
 Emmanuelle 3: A Lesson in Love (1994)
 Emmanuelle 4: Concealed Fantasy (1994)
 Emmanuelle 5: A Time to Dream (1994)
 Emmanuelle 6: One Final Fling (1994)
 Emmanuelle 7: The Meaning of Love (1994)

Emmanuelle 2000 series (USA)
 Emmanuelle 2000: Being Emmanuelle (2000)
 Emmanuelle 2000: Emmanuelle and the Art of Love (2000)
 Emmanuelle 2000: Emmanuelle in Paradise (2000)
 Emmanuelle 2000: Jewel of Emmanuelle (2000)
 Emmanuelle 2000: Intimate Encounters (2000)
 Emmanuelle 2000: Emmanuelle's Sensual Pleasure (2000)
 Emmanuelle 2000: Emmanuelle Pie (2002)

Emmanuelle TV film (USA)
 Emmanuelle in Rio (2003)

Emmanuelle Private Collection series (USA)
 Emmanuelle Private Collection: Sex Goddess (2004)
 Emmanuelle Private Collection: Emmanuelle vs. Dracula (2004)
 Emmanuelle Private Collection: Sex Talk (2004)
 Emmanuelle Private Collection: The Sex Lives of Ghosts (2004)
 Emmanuelle Private Collection: Sexual Spells (2004)
 Emmanuelle Private Collection: The Art of Ecstasy (2006)
 Emmanuelle Private Collection: Jesse's Secret Desires (2006)

Emmanuelle Through Time series (USA)
 Emmanuelle Through Time: Emmanuelle's Skin City (2011)
 Emmanuelle Through Time: Emmanuelle's Sexy Bite (2011)
 Emmanuelle Through Time: Sex, Chocolate & Emmanuelle (2011)
 Emmanuelle Through Time: Rod Steele 0014 & Naked Agent 0069 (2011)
 Emmanuelle Through Time: Sex Tales (2011)
 Emmanuelle Through Time: Emmanuelle's Supernatural Sexual Activity (2011)
 Emmanuelle Through Time: Emmanuelle's Forbidden Pleasures (2011)

Others
 Emmanuelle: A Hard Look, a documentary on the series (2000)
 Pretty Cool, a retitled, cut version of Emmanuelle Pie (2002)
 Emmanuelle Tango, a potential theatrical release, cancelled (2006)
 Emmanuelle in Wonderland, a retitled, cut version of Sex Tales (2012)
 Adventures Into The Woods: A Sexy Musical, a further edit of Emmanuelle in Wonderland (2015)

Other films 
A great number of films, particularly in the sexploitation genre and sometimes retroactively, included the name 'Emmanuelle' or its variants in their titles (at least in some of their releases) for exploitative reasons, although none of them had been legally or artistically related to the original series or its title character.

The Spanish-Italian "Black Emanuelle" films created a following on their own right.

 Black Emanuelle (1975)
 Black Emanuelle 2 (1976)
 Emanuelle in Bangkok (1976)
 Emanuelle in America (1977)
 Emanuelle Around the World (1977)
 Emanuelle and the Last Cannibals (1977)
 Emanuelle and the White Slave Trade (1978) 
 Violence in a Women's Prison (1982)
 Emanuelle Escapes from Hell (1983)

Such films also include:  
 Io, Emmanuelle (A Man for Emmanuelle) (1969), directed by Cesare Canevari.	
 Amore libero - Free Love (The Real Emanuelle, 1974), directed by Pier Ludovico Pavoni.
 Emanuelle's Revenge (Emanuelle e Françoise le sorelline 1975), directed by Joe D'Amato.
 Tokyo Emmanuelle (1975), directed by Akira Katō.
 La Marge (1976) (also released as Emmanuelle 77), directed by Walerian Borowczyk.
 Laure (1976) (also released as Forever Emmanuelle), directed by Emmanuelle Arsan.
 Black Emmanuelle, White Emmanuelle (Velluto nero, Emanuelle in Egypt 1976), directed by Brunello Rondi.
 Yellow Emanuelle (Il Mondo dei sensi di Emy Wong 1977), directed by Bitto Albertini.
 Sister Emanuelle (1977), directed by Giuseppe Vari.  
 Vanessa (1977), directed by Hubert Frank. 
 Felicity (1978), directed by John D. Lamond.
 Carry On Emmannuelle (1978) directed by Gerald Thomas.
 Emmanuelle in Soho (1981), directed by David Hughes

References

External links 
 The watershed moment in film that was ... Emmanuelle (by Alex Cox, The Guardian, Friday 15 December 2000)

 
Characters in French novels of the 20th century
Fictional pornographic film actors
Fictional bisexual females
Literary characters introduced in 1959
Fictional French people
Female characters in film
French drama films
Fictional LGBT characters in literature
Fictional LGBT characters in film

ja:エマニエル夫人